Kshira is a Sanskrit word for milk. Kshira is also the archaic name for sweet rice pudding, kheer. Kshira is used and perceived differently from normal milk, which is commonly known as Dugdha in Sanskrit. Kshira is variably used for any liquid or watery substance as well. Kshira is also used in Hindu mythology and cosmogony to describe the Ocean of Milk and the abode of the deity Vishnu, the Kshira Sagara.

Usage in popular culture
 Kheer
 Sheer khurma
 Kshira Sagara, or milk ocean 
 Sheera as a sweet porridge, alternatively known as Halva.
 Sheermal
 Shirodhara, as an Ayurvedic therapy.
 Kshira, brand name of dairy products produced by DS Group.
 Ksirodakasayi Vishnu, expanded form of Vishnu, residing in the Kshira Sagara.

See also
 Ocean of Milk
 Kheer
 Payasam 
 Sheermal

References

Milk in culture
Sanskrit words and phrases